Robert H. Fletcher (February 28, 1900 – August 5, 1968) was an American football player and coach.

Playing career
Fletcher played quarterback for the Illinois Fighting Illini football from 1918 to 1920.  His 1919 Illinois Fighting Illini football team famously won the national title, after he kicked a game-winning field goal to defeat Ohio State.  He was named All-Big Ten Conference in 1918, 1919, and 1920.  He was also named to the All-Western college football team of 1920.

Head football coach
Fletcher first coached three seasons as the head football coach of Findlay High School in Findlay, Ohio from 1921 to 1923, amassing a record of 24–6.

In 1924, he moved to Cleveland to coach at the Case School of Applied Science, known today as Case Western Reserve University. Fletcher coached both the school's football and basketball teams.  His overall football record was 19–27–7 and his overall basketball record was 30–29.

Head coaching record

College football

References

External links
 

1900 births
1968 deaths
American football quarterbacks
Basketball coaches from Ohio
Case Western Spartans football coaches
Case Western Spartans men's basketball coaches
Illinois Fighting Illini football players
High school football coaches in Ohio
Sportspeople from Cleveland
Players of American football from Cleveland